Enteucha cyanochlora is a moth of the family Nepticulidae. It is only known from Guyana.

External links
A review and checklist of the Neotropical Nepticulidae (Lepidoptera)

Nepticulidae
Endemic fauna of Guyana
Leaf miners
Moths described in 1915
Moths of South America
Taxa named by Edward Meyrick